L-(+)-(S)-Canavanine is a non-proteinogenic amino acid found in certain leguminous plants. It is structurally related to the proteinogenic α-amino acid L-arginine, the sole difference being the replacement of a methylene bridge (-- unit) in arginine with an oxa group (i.e., an oxygen atom) in canavanine. Canavanine is accumulated primarily in the seeds of the organisms which produce it, where it serves both as a highly deleterious defensive compound against herbivores (due to cells mistaking it for arginine) and a vital source of nitrogen for the growing embryo. The related L-canaline is similar to ornithine.

Toxicity  
The mechanism of canavanine's toxicity is that organisms that consume it typically mistakenly incorporate it into their own proteins in place of L-arginine, thereby producing structurally aberrant proteins that may not function properly. Cleavage by arginase also produces canaline, a potent insecticide.

The toxicity of canavanine may be enhanced under conditions of protein starvation, and canavanine toxicity, resulting from consumption of Hedysarum alpinum seeds with a concentration of 1.2% canavanine weight/weight, has been implicated in the death of a malnourished Christopher McCandless. (McCandless was the subject of Jon Krakauer's book (and subsequent movie) Into the Wild).

In mammals 
NZB/W F1, NZB, and DBA/2 mice fed L-canavanine develop a syndrome similar to systemic lupus erythematosus, while BALB/c mice fed a steady diet of protein containing 1% canavanine showed no change in lifespan.

Alfalfa seeds and sprouts contain L-canavanine. The L-canavanine in alfalfa has been linked to lupus-like symptoms in primates, including humans, and other auto-immune diseases. Often stopping consumption reverses the problem.

Tolerance 
Some specialized herbivores tolerate L-canavanine either because they metabolize it efficiently (cf. L-canaline) or avoid its incorporation into their own nascent proteins. An example of this ability can be found in the larvae of the tobacco budworm Heliothis virescens, which can tolerate massive amounts of dietary canavanine. These larvae fastidiously avoid incorporation of L-canavanine into their nascent proteins (presumably by virtue of highly discriminatory arginine—tRNA ligase, the enzyme responsible for the first step in the incorporation of arginine into proteins). In contrast, larvae of the tobacco hornworm Manduca sexta can only tolerate tiny amounts (1.0 microgram per kilogram of fresh body weight) of dietary canavanine because their arginine-tRNA ligase has little, if any, discriminatory capacity. No one has examined experimentally the arginine-tRNA synthetase of these organisms. But comparative studies of the incorporation of radiolabeled L-arginine and L-canavanine have shown that in Manduca sexta, the ratio of incorporation is about 3 to 1.

Dioclea megacarpa seeds contain high levels of canavanine. The beetle Caryedes brasiliensis is able to tolerate this however as it has the most highly discriminatory arginine-tRNA ligase known. In this insect, the level of radiolabeled L-canavanine incorporated into newly synthesized proteins is barely measurable. Moreover, this beetle uses canavanine as a nitrogen source to synthesize its other amino acids to allow it to develop.

See also
 Canaline
 Arginine

References

Bibliography 

 
 

.........

Amino acids
Toxic amino acids
Non-proteinogenic amino acids
Plant toxins